The 27th Academy of Country Music Awards was held on April 29, 1992, at the Universal Amphitheatre, in Los Angeles, California . The ceremony was hosted by Clint Black, Lorrie Morgan, and Travis Tritt.

Winners and nominees 
Winners are shown in bold.

Performers

Presenters

References 

Academy of Country Music Awards
1992 in American music
Academy of Country Music Awards
Academy of Country Music Awards
Academy of Country Music Awards
Academy of Country Music Awards